Sunil Das Gupta (date of birth unknown, died 12 December 2004) was an Indian cricketer. He played one first-class match for Bengal in 1952/53.

See also
 List of Bengal cricketers

References

External links
 

Year of birth missing
2004 deaths
Indian cricketers
Bengal cricketers
Cricketers from Kolkata